Danièle Debernard (born 21 July 1954) is a French former alpine skier who won two medals between the 1972 Winter Olympics and the 1976 Winter Olympics.

Biography
She was born in Aime. In 1972 she won the silver medal in the Olympic slalom event. Four years later she won the bronze medal in the 1976 Olympic giant slalom competition. She also finished fourth in the slalom contest and fifth in the downhill event. 

During her career she has achieved 15 results among the top 3 (5 victories) in the World Cup.

References

External links
 
 

1954 births
Living people
French female alpine skiers
Olympic alpine skiers of France
Olympic silver medalists for France
Olympic bronze medalists for France
Olympic medalists in alpine skiing
Medalists at the 1972 Winter Olympics
Medalists at the 1976 Winter Olympics
Alpine skiers at the 1972 Winter Olympics
Alpine skiers at the 1976 Winter Olympics